Víctor Manuel Cervera Pacheco (April 23, 1936 – August 18, 2004) was a Mexican politician who served as Governor of Yucatán from 1984 to 1988, and again from 1995 through 2001. From 1988 to 1994 Cervera served as Secretary of Agrarian Reform. He died on August 18, 2004, from a heart attack.

Cervera was an active member of the Institutional Revolutionary Party while an elected official. He served as a mayor, governor, federal deputy (for Yucatán's First District) and in the federal executive cabinet.

References 

1936 births
2004 deaths
Governors of Yucatán (state)
Institutional Revolutionary Party politicians
20th-century Mexican politicians
21st-century Mexican politicians
Politicians from Yucatán (state)
Municipal presidents in Yucatán (state)